Raphitoma oblonga is a species of sea snail, a marine gastropod mollusk in the family Raphitomidae.

Description
The length varies between 12 mm and 14 mm, its diameter between 5 mm and 5.5 mm.

The shell has a fusiform shape and a rather high acuminate spire. The body whorl is bulbous. The whorls are covered with regular longitudinal ribs forming small reticulations, when crossed by the spiral riblets. The aperture is oblong. The short siphonal canal is slightly bent. The ground color of the shell is dark brown, sometimes with white spots.

Distribution
This marine species occurs in the English Channel.

References

 Dautzenberg, P. & Durouchoux, P. (1913) Les mollusques de la Baie de Saint-Malo (suite). La Feuille des Jeunes Naturalistes, 43(515), 9–16
 Giannuzzi-Savelli R., Pusateri F. & Bartolini S. (2018). A revision of the Mediterranean Raphitomidae (Gastropoda: Conoidea) 5: loss of planktotrophy and pairs of species, with the description of four new species. Bollettino Malacologico. 54, supplement 11: 1-77

External links
 Jeffreys J.G. (1862-1869). British conchology. Vol. 1: pp. cxiv + 341 [1862. Vol. 2: pp. 479 [1864]. Vol. 3: pp. 394 [1865]. Vol. 4: pp. 487 [1867]. Vol. 5: pp. 259 ]
 Locard A. (1891). Les coquilles marines des côtes de France. Annales de la Société Linnéenne de Lyon. 37: 1-385
 Locard A. (1886). Prodrome de malacologie française. Catalogue général des mollusques vivants de France. Mollusque marins. Lyon, H. Georg & Paris, Baillière : pp. X + 778
 
 Biolib.cz: Raphitoma oblonga

oblonga
Gastropods described in 1867